José William Vesentini (born in 1950 in Presidente Bernardes) is a Brazilian human geographer. He teaches geography and areas of political geography and geopolitics, and is regarded as a pioneer of critical geography.

Life 

Vesentini is a grandson of Italian anarchists who came to Brazil to escape fascism. For more than 10 years he taught in the first and second grades and participated in important educational experiences during the 1970s: the supplementary course in the Metalworkers Union of São Bernardo do Campo and Diadema (1974-1976), and the Centre for Educational Guidance COE, from 1973 to 1977, a private high school transformed into a cooperative run by teachers. 

In 1984 he became a professor and researcher in the Department of Geography at the Faculty of Philosophy, Literature and Human Sciences at University of São Paulo (FFLCH). His work Brazil: Society and Space, published in 1984, was the first textbook to adopt the approach of critical geography, which served as a reference for most subsequent Brazilian geography manuals.

Within academia, Vesentini is better known as William Vesentini; he is livre-docente since 2003 at the Department. Among his areas of greatest contribution in geography are geography and geopolitics, on which he wrote more than 30 books. He conducted consultancies for schools, state and local departments of education and research institutions and / or specialized publications. He explained Brazil's public and private positions on Brazilian Geography, as well as Milton Santos, Aziz Ab'Saber, Jurandyr Ross, Manuel Correia de Andrade, Ruy Moreira, Antonio Christofoletti, among others.

References

1950 births
Brazilian geographers
Geopoliticians
University of São Paulo alumni
Academic staff of the University of São Paulo
Living people